Neil Burton Rolnick (born October 22, 1947) is an American composer and educator living in New York City.

Life
Rolnick was born in Dallas, Texas, and studied English literature at Harvard University where he received a BA in 1969. He then turned to music, studying composition first at the San Francisco Conservatory in 1973–74), then with Richard Felciano, and finally with Andrew Imbrie and Olly Wilson at the University of California, Berkeley, where he received an MA in 1976 and a PhD in 1980. Concurrently he also studied computer music with John Chowning at Stanford University and was a visiting researcher at IRCAM in Paris from 1977 to 1979 (Marshall 2001). Rolnick also studied composition with Darius Milhaud (Oteri and Rolmick 2013) and John Coolidge Adams, and computer music with James A. Moorer.. He has lived in New York City since 2002.

Teaching
From 1981 to 2013 Rolnick taught at the Rensselaer Polytechnic Institute, where he founded the iEAR Studios (Marshall 2001). In 1991, as head of Rensselaer's Arts Department (Rensselaer Arts Department website) he led the establishment of the nation's first MFA program in Integrated Electronic Arts.

Musical production
Rolnick's compositions have appeared on 18 records and CDs, and he was a pioneer in the use of computers in performance. Much of Rolnick's musical output involves the use of computers and digital media, but it is generally notable for its accessibility and good humor. His music has been characterized by critics as "sophisticated" (Ken Smith, Gramophone), "hummable and engaging" (Steve Barnes, Albany (NY) Times Union), and as having "good senses of showmanship and humor" (Kyle Gann, The Village Voice).

Discography 
Orchestra Underground: Tech & Techno (includes The iFiddle Concerto) (2014) (digital release by American Composers Orchestra)
Neil Rolnick: Gardening At Gropius House (2013) (Innova Records 877)
Neil Rolnick: Extended Family (2011) (Innova Records 782)
The NYFA Collection: 25 Years of New York New Music (includes The Gathering from Extended Family) (2010) (Innova Records 233)
Neil Rolnick: The Economic Engine (2009) (Innova Records 724)
Neil Rolnick: Digits (2006) (Innova Records 656)
Neil Rolnick: Shadow Quartet (2005) (Innova Records 631)
Neil B. Rolnick's Fish Love That (2002) (Deep Listening Records DL 18-2002CD)
Neil B. Rolnick: Requiem Songs: For the Victims of Nationalism (1996) (Albany Records Troy188)
Transforms: The Nerve Event Project (includes NerveUs) (1993) (Cuneiform Records 55011)
Neil B. Rolnick: Macedonian Air Drumming (1992) (Bridge Records BCD9030)
Neil B. Rolnick: ElectriCity (1992) (OO Discs #8)
CDCM Computer Music Series Vol. 11 (includes The Persistence of the Clave) (1992) (Centaur Records CDC2133)
CDCM Computer Music Seris Vol. 7 (includes Vocal Chords and A Robert Johnson Sampler) (1990) (Centaur Records CRC2047)
Imaginary Landscapes (includes Balkanization) (1989) (Nonesuch Records 9 79235-2)
CDCM Computer Music Series Vol. 2 (includes What Is the Use?) (1988) Centaur Records CRC2039)
Neil B. Rolnick: Real Time/A La Mode (1987) (Composers Recordings, Inc. CRI SD 540)
Neil B. Rolnick: Solos (1984) (1750 Arch Records S-1793)

References
Marshall, Ingram D. 2001. "Rolnick, Neil Burton". The New Grove Dictionary of Music and Musicians, second edition, edited by Stanley Sadie and John Tyrrell. London: Macmillan Publishers.
 Transcribed by Julia Lu. (accessed October 3, 2013).

External links 
 Neil Rolnick official site
  (accessed October 3, 2013).

Listening
 John Schaefer interviews Rolnick on WNYC (2006)
 Jennifer Nathan interviews Rolnick on WAMC (2005)

1947 births
Living people
20th-century classical composers
21st-century classical composers
American male classical composers
American classical composers
American electronic musicians
People from Dallas
Harvard University alumni
University of California, Berkeley alumni
Rensselaer Polytechnic Institute faculty
Pupils of Darius Milhaud
21st-century American composers
20th-century American composers
Albany Records artists